The Vegas Strip Wars (also called The Las Vegas Strip Wars) is a 1984 American TV movie directed by George Englund and starred Rock Hudson (his final television film), Sharon Stone, James Earl Jones and Pat Morita.

Plot
The plot involves a charming Las Vegas hotel owner named Neil Chaine (Hudson) who gets fired by his superiors from the hotel-casino where he operates. Determined to seek revenge on his former employers in a subtle way, Chaine uses his severance pay to purchase a decaying casino next door to his former hotel to turn it into the Strip's top attraction. Help for Chaine comes from an assortment of people who include Sarah Shipman (Stone) a young casino hostess who tries to help him gain a gambling license, as well as Jack Madrid (Jones) a flamboyant sports promoter who is asked to hold a boxing match at Chaine's hotel, while Madrid may or may not be on Chaine's side... depending on where the money should be.

Toward the end when Chaine's new hotel looks like it will be closed down because of various debts having rung up during his opening of the place, he decides to settle his debts by playing high-stakes roulette and craps at his former partners hotel to get the money the honest way and not through various and less-than-legal means.

Foreshadowing
When the film first aired, the public did not know that Hudson had been diagnosed with AIDS earlier in the year, despite clear physical evidence of his experiencing the symptoms. In a scene with Sharon Stone in a cell at Alcatraz Rock, Hudson quotes an Oscar Wilde line from "The Ballad of Reading Gaol". The quote is "that little tent of blue which prisoners call the sky" and Rock remarks that Oscar Wilde was put in prison for being a homosexual. The movie cuts to an implied heterosexual sex scene between Rock Hudson and Sharon Stone in the prison cell.

Cast
Rock Hudson as Neil Chaine
Sharon Stone as Sarah Shipman
Madison Mason as Gray Ryan
Robert Costanzo as Stan Markham
Dennis Holahan as Jimmy Weldstrom
Robin Gammell as Marvin Berman
Tony Russel as Morgan Steinman
Pat Morita as Yip Tak
James Earl Jones as Jack Madrid
Bryan Englund as Garland

External links
 

1984 television films
1984 films
1984 drama films
American drama television films
Films directed by George Englund
Films set in the Las Vegas Valley
NBC network original films
1980s American films
1980s English-language films